No Questions Asked is the first studio album by Los Angeles punk rock band the Flesh Eaters, released in 1980 on Upsetter Records.

Critical reception
According to reviewer Joseph Neff from The Vinyl District:

For his part, Jay Hinman from Perfect Sound Forever, was of the view that:

Reissues
In February 2004, Atavistic Records released a remastered edition on CD of the original record, which was extended with ten bonus tracks, including the entire four-song debut EP Flesh Eaters from 1978, the three cuts contributed by the band to the Tooth and Nail compilation in 1979, and three previously unreleased demo recordings from 1978. Mark Wheaton was in charge of the mastering at Catasonic Studios in Echo Park, California.

Track listings

1980 LP release

2004 remastered CD edition
The extended version contained 10 bonus tracks: 15 to 17 were originally released as part of the 1979 Tooth and Nail compilation, 18 to 21 were originally released in 1978 as the four-song EP Flesh Eaters, and 22 to 24 are previously unreleased material.

Personnel

The Flesh Eaters
Chris Desjardins (best known as Chris D.) – Vocals
Joe Ramirez – Guitar
Pat Garrett – Guitar (track B1)
John Richey – Bass (A1, A3 to A5, B2 to B5, B7)
John Doe – Bass (A2, A7, B1, B6)
Karla "Maddog" Barrett – Drums (A1, A3 to A5, B2)
Don Bonebrake – Drums (A2, A7, B1, B6)
Joe Nanini – Drums (B3 to B5, B7)
Judith Bell (credited as V) – Backing vocals (A2, A4, A5, B6, B7)
Exene Cervenka – Bracelets and 8 ball
2004 bonus tracks personnel
Chris Desjardins – Vocals
Pat Garrett – Guitar (15, 16)
John Doe – Bass (15, 16)
Don Bonebrake – Drums (15, 16)
Exene Cervenka – Backing vocals (15, 16)
John Curry – Guitar (17 to 21)
Scott Lasken – Bass (17 to 21)
Dennis Walsh – Drums (17 to 21)
Judith Bell (credited as V) – Backing vocals (17)
Tito Larriva – Guitar (22 to 24)
John Richey – Bass (22 to 24)
Joe Nanini – Drums (22 to 24)

Production
Randolph J. Stevens – Executive in charge of production
Chris Desjardins – Production, graphic design (front cover)
Judith Bell – Graphic design (back cover, disc labels)
Larry Duhart – Engineering
Zamp – Engineering
Larry Boden – Mastering
Additional production (2004 CD edition)
Chris Desjardins – Co-production (15, 16), remixing (17), mixing (22 to 24)
Judith Bell – Co-production (15, 16)
Zamp – Engineering (15, 16)
Randy Stodola – Co-production (17 to 21), production (22 to 24), engineering (17 to 24)
Flesheaters – Co-production (17 to 21)
Mark Wheaton – Mastering
Byron Coley – Liner notes

Notes

References

External links
 No Questions Asked. AllMusic.
 No Questions Asked. Discogs.
 No Questions Asked. Rate Your Music.

The Flesh Eaters albums
1980 debut albums